GSMD may refer to:
Greater Swiss Mountain Dog
Guildhall School of Music and Drama, an independent music and dramatic arts school, founded in 1880 in London, England
General Society of Mayflower Descendants or the Mayflower Society, a hereditary organization of individuals who have documented their descent from one or more of the 102 passengers who arrived on the Mayflower in 1620 at what is now Plymouth, Massachusetts
Greater Sharpstown Management District, in Houston, Texas
Greater Southeast Management District, in Houston, Texas
gsmd, GSM daemon by Openmoko